Sargaz or Sar-e Gaz or Sar Gaz may refer to:
 Sar Gaz, Esfandaqeh, Kerman Province
 Sar Gaz-e Pain, Kerman Province
 Sar Gaz, South Khorasan
 Sar-e Gaz-e Ahmadi
 Sargaz-e Khazor Safakalinu